Henri Speville (born November 1, 1971) is a Mauritian football defender who last played for Pamplemousses SC.  He was also a member of the Mauritius national football team from 1996–2007, earning 72 caps.

External links 

1971 births
Living people
Mauritian footballers
Mauritius international footballers
Association football defenders
AS Port-Louis 2000 players
Mauritian Premier League players
Pamplemousses SC players